HD 106252 b is a large gas giant extrasolar planet about 10 times more massive than Jupiter. It was announced in 2001 by the European Southern Observatory. The discovery was confirmed by a different team using the Lick Telescope.

Astrometry of HD 106252 has determined an orbital inclination of either 46° or 134°, depending on whether the solution is prograde or retrograde.

References

External links
 

Exoplanets discovered in 2001
Giant planets
Virgo (constellation)
Exoplanets detected by radial velocity
Exoplanets detected by astrometry